Duncan Selby McCallum (March 29, 1940 –  March 31, 1983) was a Canadian professional ice hockey player who played 100 games in the World Hockey Association and 187 games in the National Hockey League.

He was born in Flin Flon, Manitoba and played for such teams as the Chicago Cougars, Houston Aeros, New York Rangers, and Pittsburgh Penguins.

After his playing career, McCallum coached the Brandon Wheat Kings of the Western Hockey League for five seasons, winning Coach of the Year honors in two of them; the Coach of the Year trophy was renamed the Dunc McCallum Memorial Trophy in his honour after his death.

Career statistics

Awards and achievements
Turnbull Cup MJHL Championship (1960)
WCHL Coach of the Year (1977)
Ed Chynoweth Cup (WHL) Championship (1979)
WHL Coach of the Year (1979)
"Honoured Member" of the Manitoba Hockey Hall of Fame

External links

Dunc McCallum's biography at Manitoba Hockey Hall of Fame

1940 births
1983 deaths
Baltimore Clippers players
Brandon Wheat Kings coaches
Brandon Wheat Kings players
Canadian ice hockey defencemen
Chicago Cougars players
Edmonton Oil Kings (WCHL) players
Houston Aeros (WHA) players
Sportspeople from Flin Flon
New York Rangers players
Pittsburgh Penguins players
Ice hockey people from Manitoba
Canadian ice hockey coaches